Fred Wallace Slaughter (born 1973) is an American lawyer who is a United States district judge of the United States District Court for the Central District of California. He previously served as a judge on the California Superior Court for Orange County from 2014 to 2022.

Education 
Slaughter earned a Bachelor of Arts degree from the University of California, Los Angeles in 1996 and a Juris Doctor from the UCLA School of Law in 1999. Slaughter's father, Fred Slaughter, was a basketball player for the UCLA Bruins and one of the first African Americans to work as a sports agent and his mother, Kay, was a nurse. He has one sister, Hilary.

Career 
Slaughter began his career as a law clerk in the Los Angeles City Attorney’s Office. From 2000 to 2002, Slaughter served as a deputy city attorney. From 2004 to 2006, he worked as a coordinator for Project Safe Neighborhoods. Slaughter then worked as an assistant United States attorney for the Central District of California, District of Oregon, and District of Arizona. He was appointed to serve as a judge of the Orange County Superior Court by  Governor Jerry Brown to the seat vacated by the retirement of Judge Gregory Munoz. He was sworn in on January 31, 2014.

Federal judicial service 

On December 15, 2021, President Joe Biden nominated Slaughter to serve as a United States district judge of the United States District Court for the Central District of California. President Biden nominated Slaughter to the seat vacated by Judge Andrew J. Guilford, who assumed senior status on July 5, 2019. On January 12, 2022, a hearing on his nomination was held before the Senate Judiciary Committee. On February 10, 2022, his nomination was reported out of committee by a 15–7 vote. On March 16, 2022, the United States Senate invoked cloture on his nomination by a 56–41 vote. On March 17, 2022, his nomination was confirmed by a 57–41 vote. He received his judicial commission on April 19, 2022.

See also 
 List of African-American federal judges
 List of African-American jurists

References

External links 

1973 births
Living people
20th-century American lawyers
21st-century American judges
21st-century American lawyers
African-American judges
African-American lawyers
Assistant United States Attorneys
California lawyers
California state court judges
Judges of the United States District Court for the Central District of California
People from Santa Monica, California
Superior court judges in the United States
UCLA School of Law alumni
United States district court judges appointed by Joe Biden
University of California, Los Angeles alumni